Vinyl fluoride is an organic halide with the chemical formula C2H3F.  It is a colorless gas with a faint etherlike odor.  It is used as the monomeric precursor to the fluoropolymer polyvinylfluoride.

Production
It was first prepared in 1901 by Frédéric Swarts, the Belgian chemist who was the first to prepare chlorofluorocarbons in 1892.  Swarts used the reaction of zinc with 1,1-difluoro-2-bromoethane. It is produced industrially by two routes, one being the mercury-catalyzed reaction of acetylene and hydrogen fluoride:
HC≡CH  +  HF   →   CH2=CHF
It is also prepared from 1,1-chlorofluoroethane:
CH3CHClF  →   CH2=CHF  +  HCl

Safety
Vinyl fluoride is classified as an IARC Group 2A carcinogen (likely to cause cancer in humans).

Additional data
Its critical point is at 54.8 °C (328 K) and 5.24 MPa. Its molecular dipole moment is 1.4 Debye and heat of vaporization is 361 kJ/kg.

See also 
 Polyvinyl fluoride
 Vinyl chloride
 Vinyl bromide

References

External links 
 US Occupational Safety and Health Administration data sheet
CDC - NIOSH Pocket Guide to Chemical Hazards
 Vinyl fluoride data sheet, EnvironmentalChemistry.com
 Vinyl fluoride data sheet, airliquide.com
MSDS Safety data at inchem.org
Information about its carcinogenity

Organofluorides
Refrigerants
IARC Group 2A carcinogens
Vinyl compounds